João de Vallera is the former Portuguese Ambassador to the United Kingdom.  de Vallera was born in Angola and spent 15 years in Brussels working for the EU before becoming a diplomat.  He has served as Portugal's ambassador to Spain, Ireland (1998-2001), Germany (2002–07) and to the United States (2007-2010).

Recipient of the Grand Cross of the Order of Merit (Portugal) on 23 July 1998.

References

Ambassadors of Portugal to Spain
Ambassadors of Portugal to Ireland
Ambassadors of Portugal to Germany
Ambassadors of Portugal to the United States
Ambassadors of Portugal to the United Kingdom
1950 births
Living people
Grand Crosses of the Order of Merit (Portugal)
Officers Crosses of the Order of Merit of the Federal Republic of Germany